The Plan is the fifth studio album by The Osmonds, released in 1973. The album contains songs that are about the Mormon faith; its name derives from the Plan of Salvation, a key tenet of the Mormon faith. It reached number 58 on the Billboard Top LPs chart.  Two of the album's singles, "Goin' Home" and "Let Me In", both peaked at number 36 on the Billboard Hot 100.  The album's third single, "Movie Man", did not chart.

Reception
In a retrospective review for AllMusic, Donald A. Guarisco gave the album a mixed 2.5 stars out a possible 5. He wrote, "Anyone who thinks of this family group as a bubblegum soul outfit will be bowled over by this incredibly ambitious outing, which attempts to explain the family's Mormon beliefs through a series of songs that cut across a wide variety of pop genres." The Osmonds proved themselves versatile at tackling a variety of musical styles, according to Guarisco, but the album was ultimately a "misfire" because the creative diversity led to a lack of cohesion for The Plan as a whole.

Sean Ross of RadioInsight noted that the Osmonds' singles in 1973 had fallen in popularity and radio airplay compared to 1971 and 1972, in part due to increased teen idol competition from The DeFranco Family.

Track listing
All songs written and composed by Alan Osmond, Merrill Osmond, and Wayne Osmond.

Credits
 Producer: Alan Osmond
 Engineer: Ed Greene
 Recorded at Kolob Studios

Promo video
To commemorate the album's release, the band produced a 10-minute music video, performing a medley of the selected songs in the following order: "Traffic in My Mind", "Let Me In", "Are You Up There?", "The Last Days", "One Way Ticket to Anywhere", and "Goin' Home". This medley was performed live, and during Wayne's flute solo intro to "Let Me In", Alan announced the recent release of "The Plan". A full video version of "Let Me In" was also released from the same taping.

Charts

Album

Singles

Certifications

References

1973 albums
Concept albums
The Osmonds albums
MGM Records albums
Mormon music